Fruzsina is a Hungarian female given name, often a diminutive of Eufrozina, the Hungarian form of Euphrosyne. 

Individuals bearing the name Fruzsina include:  
Fruzsina Brávik (born 1986), Hungarian water polo player
Fruzsina Dávid-Azari (born 1989), Hungarian handballer
Fruzsina Medgyesi (born 1999),  Hungarian figure skater
Fruzsina Palkó (born 1992), Hungarian handballer
Fruzsina Schildkraut (born 1998), Hungarian footballer
Fruzsina Takács (born 1992), Hungarian handballer

References

Hungarian feminine given names